Panicum socotranum is a species of grass in the family Poaceae.

It is found only on Socotra island off the coast of East Africa, politically in Yemen.

References

socotranum
Endemic flora of Socotra
Grasses of Africa
Flora of Yemen
Near threatened flora of Africa
Taxonomy articles created by Polbot